Stanislav Svoboda may refer to:

 Stanislav Svoboda (cyclist) (born 1930), Czech cyclist
 Stanislav Svoboda (speedway rider) (1919–1992) Czech speedway rider